George Musser (born 1965) is a contributing editor for Scientific American magazine in New York and the author of The Complete Idiot’s Guide to String Theory and of Spooky Action at a Distance.

Biography
Musser did his undergraduate studies in electrical engineering and mathematics at Brown University and his graduate studies in planetary science at Cornell University, where he was a National Science Foundation Graduate Fellow. His thesis work modeled mantle convection on Venus in order to explain broad plateaus, known as coronae, mapped by the Magellan orbiter. Musser served as editor of Mercury magazine and of the Universe in the Classroom tutorial series at the Astronomical Society of the Pacific, a science and science-education nonprofit based in San Francisco.

A number of articles Musser solicited and edited have appeared in The Best American Science Writing and The Best American Science & Nature Writing anthologies. He was the originator and one of the lead editors for the single-topic issue "A Matter of Time," Scientific American (Sept. 2002), which won a National Magazine Award for editorial excellence, and he coordinated the single topic issue "Crossroads for Planet Earth," Scientific American (Sept. 2005), which won a Global Media Award from the Population Institute and was a National Magazine Award finalist.  In 2010, Musser won the Jonathan Eberhart Planetary Sciences Journalism Award from the Division for Planetary Sciences for his science writing on planetary sciences. In 2011, Musser won the Science Writing Award from the American Institute of Physics for his article "Could Time End?" in the September 2010 issue of Scientific American. His book Spooky Action at a Distance: The Phenomenon That Reimagines Space and Time--and What It Means for Black Holes, the Big Bang, and Theories of Everything was published in 2015.

Musser is a resident of Glen Ridge, New Jersey.

Selected works
 2015 Spooky Action at a Distance, Farrar, Straus and Giroux

George Musser, "Artificial Imagination:  How machines could learn creativity and common sense, among other human qualities", Scientific American, vol. 320, no. 5 (May 2019), pp. 58–63.

References

External links

  on the Fediverse
 https://buckyspace.com/Strings/Welcome.html
 Solar at Home blog

American science writers
American magazine editors
Living people
Brown University School of Engineering alumni
Scientific American people
1965 births
Cornell University alumni
People from Glen Ridge, New Jersey